Heather Clark may refer to:

 Heather Clark (surfer), South African surfer
 Heather Clark (journalist), American journalist
 Heather Jo Clark (born 1980), American mixed martial artist

See also
Heather Clarke (born 1958), Canadian rower